John Roche (11 June 1905 – 4 January 1940) was a Garda Síochána Detective who was assassinated on the 3 January 1940, becoming the first Garda casualty of the Emergency Period.

Early life
John Roche was born on 11 June 1905 in Abbeyfeale, County Limerick. His mother, Mary Anne Woulfe (12 July 1872 – 16 October 1944) came from  a landed Catholic family, the daughter of merchant John Richard Woulfe. His father, Edmond J. Roche (15 November 1873 – 31 December 1945), was a peace commissioner.

Assassination
On 3 January 1940, Roche was shot fatally by Tomás Óg Mac Curtain, an IRA commandant and the son of Lord Mayor Tomás Mac Curtain. Roche and two colleges had attempted to question Mac Curtain about criminal activities when he produced a revolver. Roche was taken to the North Infirmary Hospital and died from his wounds the following day.

His death inspired greater IRA opposition amongst Irish Catholics, though Mac Curtain's death sentence was later reprieved.

References

1905 births
1940 deaths
People from County Limerick
Garda Síochána officers killed in the line of duty
People killed by the Provisional Irish Republican Army